Springfield is an unincorporated community located in Tuolumne County, California. It is a former California Gold Rush boomtown in the foothills of the Sierra Nevada, and is now designated as a California Historical Landmark. Springfield is located 1.1 mi SW of Columbia another gold rush boomtown.

History
Springfield received its name from the abundant springs gushing from limestone boulders on the site.  During the town's heyday, up to 150 miners' carts could be seen on the road, hauling gold-bearing dirt from other diggings to the springs of Springfield for washing.  The town with its stores, shops, and hotel built around a plaza once boasted 2,000 inhabitants. It is believed to have been founded by Dona Josefa Valmesada, a Mexican woman of means with the reputation of aiding Americans in the war with Mexico.

California Historical Landmark
Springfield is a California Historical Landmark.
California Historical Landmark number 432 reads:
NO. 432 SPRINGFIELD - Springfield received its name from the abundant springs gushing from limestone boulders. The town with its stores, shops, and hotel built around a plaza once boasted 2,000 inhabitants. It is believed to have been founded by Dona Josefa Valmesada, a Mexican woman of means with the reputation of aiding Americans in the war with Mexico. During the town's heyday, 150 miners' carts could be seen on the road, hauling gold-bearing dirt to Springfield springs for washing.

See also
California Historical Landmarks in Tuolumne County, California

References

Unincorporated communities in Tuolumne County, California
Unincorporated communities in California
California Historical Landmarks